Y si te vi, no me acuerdo is a 2003 Peruvian-German drama road movie written and directed by Miguel Barreda in his directorial debut. It stars Miguel Iza, Marisol Palacios and Matthias Dittmer. The film is considered the first road movie made in Peru.

Synopsis 
The paths of a man in search of his past, a woman in search of her future and another man with an obsessive goal, cross on the Pan-American highway.

Cast 
The actors participating in this film are:

 Marisol Palacios as Eva María
 Miguel Iza as "Lizard"
 Mathías Dettmer as Jo
 Gilberto Torres
 Delfina Paredes

Production 
The film was filmed between 1999 and 2000 in the DigiBeta format, and was completed in its entirety in 2001.

Release 
The film was scheduled to be released after a transfer to the 35mm format, but it could not be released because they did not get the necessary money ($40,000 dolars) for the transfer to 35mm format.

Festivals 
After failing to get financing, the film was screened at various festivals such as the Iberoamerican Quito Film Festival, Ecuador in 2003 where it won the Audience Award, as well as being screened on German and Spanish television.

Theatrical release 
The film was commercially released on May 5, 2011, in Peruvian theaters, after having obtained enough money, from Conacine, to transfer the film to the correct format.

References

External links 

 

2003 films
2003 drama films
Peruvian drama road movies
German drama road movies
2000s Peruvian films
2000s German films
2000s Spanish-language films
Films set in Peru
Films shot in Peru
2003 directorial debut films